His Majesty's Naval Base, Singapore, also Her Majesty's Naval Base, Singapore (HMNB Singapore), alternatively known as the Singapore Naval Base, Sembawang Naval Base and HMS Sembawang, was situated in Sembawang at the northern tip of Singapore and was both a Royal Navy shore establishment and a cornerstone of British defence policy (the Singapore strategy) in the Far East between the World Wars. From 1921 to 1941 it was a  China Station base, from 1941 to 1945 a repair facility for the Imperial Japanese Navy and from 1945 to 1958 a Far East Fleet base. Today, it is a commercial dockyard but British military activity still exists at the British Defence Singapore Support Unit (BDSSU).

History 

Through the 19th Century, the British Government relied on four Imperial fortress colonies as primary bases for the Royal Navy and British Army for control of the World's oceans. These were Bermuda and Halifax, Nova Scotia (military control of the latter was handed to the Canadian militia following the 1868 Confederation of Canada, and naval control to the Royal Canadian Navy after 1905) in the North Atlantic, and Gibraltar and Malta. The squadron of the Bermuda based America and West Indies Station, utilising the Panama Canal after its completion, patrolled the Atlantic and the Pacific coasts of North and South America, while vessels based in Malta could reach the Indian and Pacific oceans via the Suez Canal. As it was presumed that the only navies that could challenge the Royal Navy were those of European powers, no base equivalent to an Imperial fortress had been constructed outside of the Atlantic and its connected seas. After the Great War, the British Government devoted significant resources into building a naval base on Singapore Island, where the capital of the Straits Settlements was located, as a deterrent to the increasingly ambitious Japanese Empire with its growing fleet. Britain lacked a naval 'Imperial fortress' in the broad region of Asia, the Indian Ocean, and the Pacific Ocean. Instead, the British Empire relied on the 'island fortress' of Malta in the Mediterranean Sea to project naval and military force via the Suez Canal, a canal which had been completed in 1869. In light of the rising threat of the Imperial Japanese Navy (IJN), this was no longer adequate.

Originally announced in 1923, the construction of the base proceeded slowly at Sembawang until the Japanese invasion of Manchuria in 1931. It was completed in 1938, at a staggering cost of £60 million – equivalent to £2½ billion in 2006. The base covered  and had what was then the largest dry dock in the world, the third-largest floating dock, and enough fuel tanks to support the entire Royal Navy for six months.

It was defended by 15-inch naval guns stationed at Johore battery, Changi, and at Buona Vista Battery. Other important batteries of smaller calibre were located at Fort Siloso, Fort Canning, and Labrador. Air defence relied on the Royal Air Force (RAF) airfields at RAF Tengah and RAF Sembawang.

Winston Churchill touted it as the "Gibraltar of the East".

The base was renamed from HMS Terror to HMS Sultan on 1 January 1940 to acknowledge the proximity of the nine sultanates on the Malay Peninsula.

After the fall of Malaya on 31 January 1942, Singapore came within range of the artillery guns of the Twenty-Fifth Army of the Imperial Japanese Army (IJA), who were positioned in Johor within sight of the base. The IJA was poised to capture Singapore within a fortnight. The base was subsequently captured, largely intact, by units of the advancing IJA and became the IJN No. 101 Repair Facility through to the end of the Second World War during which time it was used by all 3 Axis powers. It was used by Italian cargo-carrying submarines until the Italian Armistice, and by German cargo-carrying submarines until the German surrender.

With the surrender of Japan in August 1945, control of the naval base and Singapore was reverted to British and Commonwealth Forces in September 1945, when allied units of South East Asia Command under Lord Louis Mountbatten started to arrive in Singapore.

Since 1972, part of the compound is now occupied by the Republic of Singapore Navy's Naval Diving Unit (NDU).

Continued Commonwealth presence 

With the complete withdrawal of British forces from Singapore in 1971, the Naval Base has since been handed over to the Singapore government, which in 1968 converted it into a commercial dockyard (as Sembawang Shipyard, now part of Singapore Exchange-listed SembCorp Marine).

After the short term ANZUK arrangement was terminated (started in 1971 and ended in 1974), New Zealand Force South East Asia (NZFORSEA) was created with the HQ being sited at the Stores Basin area adjacent to the current Sembawang Naval Basin. NZFORSEA consisted of 1 Royal New Zealand Infantry Regiment (RNZIR), which was based at Dieppe Barracks near Yishun New Town, No. 141 Flight of Royal New Zealand Air Force (RNZAF), with its Bell UH-1D/H Hueys based at Sembawang Air Base and frequent deployments of Royal New Zealand Navy (RNZN) frigates. This was the last major foreign military presence based in Singapore. Total military strength at the time stood at 850 with some 700 dependents. Under the auspices of the Five Power Defence Arrangements (FPDA), NZFORSEA took over the Royal Navy married quarters and billets, while the Installations Auxiliary Police Force (IAPF) was formed, the small police force was staffed by Singaporeans but commanded by an NZ officer to provide security to the whole area. This security blanket covered the British, UK and Australian facilities and personnel. When NZFORSEA withdrew from Singapore in 1989, it was replaced by the smaller NZ Defence Support Unit, the South East Asia (NZDSU SEA), with the IAPF still providing security to other nations including the US facilities and personnel.

The British Ministry of Defence (MoD) continues to maintain a small logistics base at Sembawang wharf to control most of the foreign military activities there, which includes repair, refuel and resupply for ships of the Australian, British and New Zealand navies as well as those from other Commonwealth countries under the auspices of FPDA.

American presence 
As part of a 1990 agreement (concluded in 1992) between Singapore and the United States, American military forces (primarily naval and air force) have been making use of Sembawang's base facilities. The Commander, Logistics Group Western Pacific has been headquartered in Sembawang since 1992, providing logistic support for the US 7th Fleet in its operations in the Pacific and Southeast Asia. The United States Coast Guard, Marine Inspection Detachment (MIDET) Singapore is also a tenant.

Apart from the US naval presence, the United States Air Force has its administration, logistics and support component for the 497th Combat Training Squadron being based there, while the squadron's flight operations are based out of Paya Lebar Air Base.

Access to Indian Navy ships 
Since 2002, Singapore has granted the Indian Navy in principle access to Sembawang Port and Indian patrol boats escorting American naval ships through the Straits of Malacca.

Installations

Admiralty IX Floating Dry Dock 
Admiralty Floating Dock No.9, a large floating dry dock, the third-largest in the world at the time of its construction, was located at the base. It was used by the aircraft carrier  for a refit in 1939. At the time, the dry dock was described as having been floated from England to Singapore 10 years before.

King George VI Graving Dock 
With the impending capture of Singapore by the Imperial Japanese Army in 1942, the dry dock gates were blown off and machinery destroyed. The dock was subsequently repaired and used throughout the war and was subjected to Allied air attacks to disable the dry dock in late 1944 and early 1945.

Senior officer commanding

Captain-in-Charge, Singapore 
Modern sources give the title "Captain-in-Charge" to the senior officer at Singapore Naval Base from 1921 to 1942, including flag officers. However, contemporary sources state that the official title wasn't granted until 1931, when Captain Birkett took on the role.

Flag Officer, Malaya and Forward Areas 
Included:

Flag Officer, Malayan Area 
Included:

See also 
 Japanese occupation of Singapore
 Bombing of Singapore (1944–1945)
 British military history
 British Far East Command
 Eastern Fleet
 Far East Strategic Reserve
 ANZUK
 New Zealand Force South East Asia
 SembCorp Marine
 497th Combat Training Squadron
 Task Force 73/Commander, Logistics Group Western Pacific

References 
Notes

Bibliography

 Morris, James. Farewell the Trumpets. Penguin Books, 1979.

Further reading

 W. David McIntyre. The Rise and Fall of the Singapore Naval Base, 1919–1942. Shoe String Pr Inc, January 1980.  / 978-0208018359
 James Neidpath. Singapore Naval Base and the Defence of Britain's Eastern Empire, 1919–1941. Clarendon Pr, January 1981.  / 978-0198224747

External links 
 HM Naval Base Singapore: personal memoir
 United States Library of Congress: Country studies on Singapore: Singapore Naval Base
 Singapore National Heritage Board: Singapore Naval base

Military of Singapore under British rule
World War II sites in Singapore
Royal Navy bases outside the United Kingdom
World War II sites in British Malaya
Singapore–United Kingdom military relations